Berrú leads here. For Max Berrú Carrión (1942-2018), the Ecuadorian and Chilean musician, see Max Berrú

Berru is a commune in the Marne department in northeastern France.

Berru, along with the neighboring commune of Cernay-lès-Reims, is notable in the literature of paleontology as the site of a geologic formation (part of the Paris Basin) that has yielded a significant number of Paleocene-strata fossils.

Population

See also
Communes of the Marne department

References

Communes of Marne (department)